London Calling is the third studio album by English rock band the Clash. It was originally released as a double album in the United Kingdom on 14 December 1979 by CBS Records, and in the United States in January 1980 by Epic Records.

The Clash recorded the album with producer Guy Stevens at Wessex Sound Studios in London during August, September and November 1979, following a change in management and a period of writer's block for songwriters Joe Strummer and Mick Jones. Bridging a traditional punk rock sound and a new wave aesthetic, London Calling reflects the band's growing interest in styles beyond their punk roots, including reggae, rockabilly, ska, New Orleans R&B, pop, lounge jazz, and hard rock. Themes include social displacement, unemployment, racial conflict, drug use, and the responsibilities of adulthood.

The album was a top ten chart success in the UK, and its lead single "London Calling" was a top 20 single. The album has sold over five million copies worldwide, and was certified platinum in the US for sales of one million. It was also met with widespread critical acclaim and has retrospectively been named one of the greatest albums of all time. On Rolling Stones list of The 500 Greatest Albums of All Time, London Calling ranked eighth in the 2003 and 2012 editions, and sixteenth in the 2020 edition. In 2010, it was one of ten classic album covers from British artists commemorated on a UK postage stamp issued by the Royal Mail.

Background
On their second album Give 'Em Enough Rope (1978), the Clash had started to depart from the punk rock sound. While touring the United States in 1979, they chose supporting acts such as rhythm and blues artists Bo Diddley, Sam & Dave, Lee Dorsey, and Screamin' Jay Hawkins, as well as neotraditional country artist Joe Ely and punk rockabilly band the Cramps. The Clash's growing fascination with rock and roll inspired their direction for London Calling.

After recording Give 'Em Enough Rope, the Clash separated from their manager Bernard Rhodes. This meant they had to leave their rehearsal studio in Camden Town. Tour manager Johnny Green and drum roadie Baker found a new place to rehearse, Vanilla Studios, in the back of a garage in Pimlico.

The Clash arrived at Vanilla in May 1979 with no new songs prepared for their third album. Main songwriters Mick Jones and Joe Strummer had experienced a period of writer's block and had not written a new song in over a year; their recently released Cost of Living EP featured a cover song and three other songs that had all been written over a year earlier.

Rehearsals 
Rehearsal were held in Vanilla Studios over mid-1979. The Clash began playing covers from genres including rockabilly, rock and roll, rhythm and blues, and reggae. In contrast to previous rehearsal sessions, the band kept these rehearsals private, and did not allow hangers-on to attend. This seclusion allowed the band to rebuild their confidence without worrying about the reaction from outsiders, who were familiar with the band's punk rock style.

The band developed an "extremely disciplined" daily routine of afternoon rehearsals, broken by a late-afternoon social football game, which fostered a friendly bond between the band members. The football was followed by drinks at a local pub, followed by a second rehearsal in the evening.

The band gradually rebuilt their confidence, with the styles of the session's early cover songs setting the template for the diverse material that would be written for London Calling. The band were also encouraged by a growing recognition of drummer Topper Headon's skills, which they realised could be used to perform music in a wide array of genres and styles beyond punk rock.

Writing and recording 

The Clash wrote and recorded demos at Vanilla Studios, with Mick Jones composing and arranging much of the music and Joe Strummer writing most of the lyrics. Strummer wrote "Lost in the Supermarket" after imagining Jones' childhood growing up in a basement with his mother and grandmother. "The Guns of Brixton" was the first of bassist Paul Simonon's compositions the band would record for an album, and the first to have him sing lead. Simonon was originally doubtful about its lyrics, which discuss an individual's paranoid outlook on life, but was encouraged by Strummer to continue working on it.

In August 1979, the band entered Wessex Studios to begin recording London Calling. The Clash asked Guy Stevens to produce the album, much to the dismay of CBS Records. Stevens had alcohol and drug problems and his production methods were unconventional. During a recording session he swung a ladder and upturned chairs – apparently to create a rock & roll atmosphere. The Clash, especially Simonon, got along well with Stevens, and found Stevens' work to be very helpful and productive to both Simonon's playing and their recording as a band. The album was recorded during a five- to six-week period involving 18-hour days, with many songs recorded in one or two takes.

The first track recorded for London Calling was "Brand New Cadillac", which the Clash had originally used as a warm-up song before recording. "Clampdown" began as an instrumental track called "Working and Waiting". While working on "The Card Cheat", the band recorded each part twice to create a "sound as big as possible".

Musical style
London Calling is regarded by music critic Mark Kidel as the first post-punk double album, as it exhibits a broader range of musical styles than the Clash's previous records. Stephen Thomas Erlewine said the album appropriated the "punk aesthetic into rock & roll mythology and roots music", while incorporating a wider range of styles such as punk, reggae, rockabilly, ska, New Orleans R&B, pop, lounge jazz, and hard rock. "Brand New Cadillac", the album's second track, was written and originally recorded by Vince Taylor and was cited by the Clash as "one of the first British rock'n'roll records". The fifth song, "Rudie Can't Fail" features a horn section and mixes elements of pop, soul, and reggae music together.

The Clash's embrace of specific musical traditions for London Calling deviated from what Greg Kot viewed as punk's iconoclastic sensibilities. Speaking on the album, Jack Sargeant remarked that "whether the Clash completely abandoned their punk roots or pushed punk's musical eclecticism and diversity into new terrain remains a controversial issue." According to rock historian Charles T. Brown, the album led to the band's association with new wave music, while music academic James E. Perone considers the album "new wave rock".

Themes 
The album's songs are generally about London, with narratives featuring both fictional and life-based characters, such as an underworld criminal named Jimmy Jazz and a gun-toting Jimmy Cliff aspirant living in Brixton ("Guns of Brixton"). In the opinion of PopMatters journalist Sal Ciolfi, the songs encompass an arrangement of urban narratives and characters, and touch on themes such as sex, depression and identity crisis. "Rudie Can't Fail" chronicles the life of a fun-loving young man who is criticised for his inability to act like a responsible adult. "Clampdown" comments on people who forsake the open-minded idealism of youth and urges young people to fight the status quo. "The Guns of Brixton" explores an individual's paranoid outlook on life, while on "Death or Glory", Strummer examines his life in retrospect and acknowledges the complications and responsibilities of adulthood. "Lover's Rock" advocates safe sex and planning.

Some songs have more widely contextualised narratives, including references to the "evil presidentes" working for the "clampdown", the lingering effects of the Spanish Civil War ("Spanish Bombs"), and how constant consumerism had led to unavoidable political apathy ("Lost in the Supermarket"). "London Calling", the album's title track and opener, was partially influenced by the March 1979 accident at a nuclear reactor at Three Mile Island in Pennsylvania. It also discusses the problems of rising unemployment, racial conflict and drug use in Great Britain. According to music critic Tom Carson, "while the album draws on the entirety of rock and roll's past for its sound, the concepts and lyrical themes are drawn from the history, politics and myths associated with the genre".

Artwork

The album's front cover features a photograph of bassist Paul Simonon smashing his Fender Precision Bass (now on display at the Museum of London, formerly Cleveland Rock and Roll Hall of Fame) against the stage at the Palladium in New York City on 20 September 1979. Simonon explained in a 2011 interview with Fender that he smashed the bass out of frustration when he learned that the bouncers at the concert would not allow the audience members to stand up out of their seats; "I wasn't taking it out on the bass guitar, cos there ain't anything wrong with it.", Simonon said. Pennie Smith, who photographed the band for the album, originally did not want the photograph to be used. She thought that it was too out of focus, but Strummer and graphic designer Ray Lowry thought it would make a good album cover. In 2002, Smith's photograph was named the best rock and roll photograph of all time by Q magazine, commenting that "it captures the ultimate rock'n'roll moment – total loss of control".

The cover artwork was designed by Lowry and was an homage to the design of Elvis Presley's self-titled debut album, with pink letters down the left side and green text across the bottom. The cover was named the ninth best album cover of all time by Q magazine in 2001. In 1995, Big Audio Dynamite (a band fronted by former Clash member Mick Jones) used the same scheme for their F-Punk album. The album cover for London Calling was among the ten chosen by the Royal Mail for a set of "Classic Album Cover" postage stamps issued in January 2010. The cover art was later parodied for the soundtrack to Tony Hawk's American Wasteland.

Release and promotion
The album was released in the United Kingdom on vinyl on 14 December 1979, and in the United States on vinyl and 8-track tape two weeks later in January 1980. A gatefold cover design of the LP was only released in Japan. Though London Calling was released as a double album it was only sold for about the price of a single album. The Clash's record label, CBS, at first denied the band's request for the album to be released as a double. In return CBS gave permission for the band to include a free 12-inch single that played at 33⅓ rpm. Ultimately, the planned 12-inch record became a second nine-track LP. The final track, "Train in Vain", was originally excluded from the back cover's track listing. It was intended to be given away through a promotion with NME, but was added to the album at the last minute after the deal fell through.

Upon its release, London Calling sold approximately two million copies. The album peaked at number nine in the United Kingdom and was certified gold in December 1979. The album performed strongly outside the United Kingdom. It reached number two in Sweden and number four in Norway. In the United States, London Calling peaked at number 27 on the Billboard Pop Albums chart and was certified platinum in February 1996. The album produced two of the band's most successful singles. "London Calling" preceded the album with a 7 December 1979 release. It peaked at number 11 on the UK Singles Chart. The song's music video, directed by Letts, featured the band performing the song on a boat in the pouring rain with the River Thames behind them. In the United States, "Train in Vain", backed with "London Calling", was released as a single in February 1980. It peaked at number 23 on the Billboard Hot 100 singles chart and "London Calling"/"Train in Vain" peaked at number 30 on the Billboard Disco Top 100 chart.

A UK-only cassette was released in 1986. A CD was released in the US in 1987, with a remastered version in the UK in 1999 followed by the US in 2000, along with the rest of the band's catalogue.

Critical reception
London Calling was met with widespread critical acclaim. Reviewing the album for The New York Times in 1980, John Rockwell said it finally validates the acclaim received by the Clash up to that point because of how their serious political themes and vital playing were retained in innovative music with a broad appeal. "This is an album that captures all the Clash's primal energy, combines it with a brilliant production job by Guy Stevens and reveals depths of invention and creativity barely suggested by the band's previous work", Rockwell said. Charles Shaar Murray wrote in NME that it was the first record to be on-par with the band's hype, while Melody Maker critic James Truman said the Clash had "discovered themselves" by embracing American music styles. Rolling Stone magazine's Tom Carson claimed the music celebrates "the romance of rock & roll rebellion", adding that it is vast, engaging, and enduring enough to leave listeners "not just exhilarated but exalted and triumphantly alive". In a five-star review, Down Beat journalist Michael Goldberg said the Clash had produced "a classic rock album which, literally, defines the state of rock and roll and against which the very best of [the 1980s] will have to be judged." Some reviewers expressed reservations, including DJ and critic Charlie Gillett, who believed some of the songs sounded like poor imitations of Bob Dylan backed by a horn section. Garry Bushell was more critical in his review for Sounds, giving the record two out of five stars while claiming the Clash had "retrogressed" to Rolling Stones-style "outlaw imagery" and "tired old rock clichés".

At the end of 1980, London Calling was voted the best album of the year in the Pazz & Jop, an annual poll of American critics published by The Village Voice. Robert Christgau, the poll's creator and supervisor, also named it 1980's best record in an accompanying essay and said, "it generated an urgency and vitality and ambition (that Elvis P. cover!) which overwhelmed the pessimism of its leftist world-view."

Reappraisal and legacy 

London Calling has since been considered by many critics to be one of the greatest rock albums of all time, including AllMusic's Stephen Thomas Erlewine, who said that it sounded more purposeful than "most albums, let alone double albums". "This epic double album, from its iconic sleeve to its wildly eclectic mash-up of styles, is surely the quintessential rock album", wrote BBC Music journalist Mark Sutherland. In Christgau's Record Guide: The '80s (1990), Christgau called it the best double album since the Rolling Stones' Exile on Main St. (1972) and said it expanded upon, rather than compromised, the Clash's driving guitar sound in a "warm, angry, and thoughtful, confident, melodic, and hard-rocking" showcase of their musical abilities. According to the English music writer Dave Thompson, London Calling established the Clash as more than "a simple punk band" with a "potent" album of neurotic post-punk, despite its amalgam of disparate and occasionally disjointed musical influences. Don McLeese from the Chicago Sun-Times regarded it as their best album and "punk's finest hour", as it found the band broadening their artistry without compromising their original vigor and immediacy. PopMatters critic Sal Ciolfi called it a "big, loud, beautiful collection of hurt, anger, restless thought, and above all hope" that still sounds "relevant and vibrant". In a review of its 25th anniversary reissue, Uncut wrote that the songs and characters in the lyrics cross-referenced each other because of the album's exceptional sequencing, adding that "The Vanilla Tapes" bonus disc enhanced what was already a "masterpiece".

According to Acclaimed Music, London Calling is the seventh most highly ranked record on critics' lists of the all-time greatest albums. In 1987, Robert Hilburn of the Los Angeles Times named it the fourth-best album of the previous 10 years and said, while the Clash's debut was a punk masterpiece, London Calling marked the genre's "coming of age" as the band led the way into "fertile post-punk territory". In 1989, Rolling Stone ranked the 1980 American release as the best album of the 1980s. In the 1994 All Time Top 1000 Albums, Colin Larkin named it the second-greatest punk album; it was also voted number 37 in Larkin's All Time Top 1000 Albums (2000). In 1999, Q magazine named London Calling the fourth-greatest British album of all time, and wrote that it is "the best Clash album and therefore among the very best albums ever recorded". The magazine later ranked it 20th on its list of the 100 Greatest Albums Ever. It has also been ranked as the sixth-greatest album of the 1970s by NME, and the second-best in a similar list by Pitchfork, whose reviewer Amanda Petrusich said that it was the Clash's "creative apex" as a "rock band" rather than as a punk band. In 2003, Rolling Stone ranked it eighth on their list of The 500 Greatest Albums of All Time, maintaining the rating in a 2012 revised list. The rating dropped to 16 in Rolling Stones revised list in 2020. Entertainment Weeklys Tom Sinclair declared it the "Best Album of All Time" in his headline for a 2004 article on the album. In 2007, it was inducted into the Grammy Hall of Fame, a collection of recordings of lasting qualitative or historical significance. In 2009, the album was profiled in the BBC Radio 1 Masterpieces series, denoting it as one of the most influential albums of all time.

25th anniversary edition 

In 2004, a 25th-anniversary "Legacy Edition" was released with a bonus CD and DVD in digipack packaging. The bonus CD features The Vanilla Tapes, missing recordings made by the band in mid-1979. The DVD includes The Last Testament – The Making of London Calling, a film by Don Letts, as well as previously unseen video footage and music videos. A limited-edition picture disc LP was released in 2010.

The edition was met with widespread critical acclaim. At Metacritic, which assigns a normalised rating out of 100 to reviews from professional critics, it has an average score of 100 out of 100, based on 12 reviews. PopMatters hailed it as "easily one of the best classic re-releases yet", while Paste said "Epic/Legacy has outdone itself." However, Blender recommended consumers opt for the original edition instead, claiming "the demo versions ... sound like an incompetent Clash cover band rehearsing in a sock".

Track listing
All lead vocals by Joe Strummer, except where noted.

 On the original version of the album, "Train in Vain" was not listed on the sleeve, nor the label on the record itself, but a sticker indicating the track was affixed to the outer cellophane wrapper. It was also scratched into the vinyl in the run-off area on the fourth side of the album. Later editions included the song in the track listing.

Personnel

The Clash
 Joe Strummer – lead and backing vocals, rhythm guitar, piano
 Mick Jones – lead guitar, piano, harmonica, backing and lead vocals
 Paul Simonon – bass guitar, backing vocals, lead vocals on "The Guns of Brixton"
 Topper Headon – drums, percussion

Additional musicians
 Mickey Gallagher – organ

The Irish Horns
 Ray Bevis – tenor saxophone
 John Earle – tenor and baritone saxophone
 Chris Gower – trombone
 Dick Hanson – trumpet, flugelhorn

Production
 Guy Stevens – producer
 Bill Price – engineer
 Jerry Green – additional engineer
 Ray Lowry – design
 Pennie Smith – photography

Charts

25th anniversary edition

Certifications

See also 
 Album era

References

Bibliography

Further reading

 
 
 
 
 
 
 
 
 
 
"London Calling" By The Clash Mix Magazine, 2000 – Very detailed article with recording setup details from the album's engineer, Bill Price.

External links
 
 

1979 albums
Albums produced by Guy Stevens
CBS Records albums
Columbia Records albums
Epic Records albums
Legacy Recordings albums
The Clash albums